Danielle Feinberg is an American cinematographer and Director of Photography for Lighting at Pixar Animation Studios. She directed lighting for the Academy Award-winning films WALL-E, Brave and Coco.

Life and career
Danielle Feinberg was born in Boulder, Colorado and graduated from Boulder High School. Growing up, she attended summer camps and after-school programs for students interested in computer programming and engineering. She attended Harvard University, where she was introduced to computer animation in a computer graphics course during her junior year. She graduated in 1996 with a Bachelor of Arts in computer science.

After graduating from Harvard, she started working at Pixar in February 1997 as a technician managing the large libraries of data and images for rendering A Bug's Life. She has since been credited for leading work in visual effects, technical direction, and graphics.

Outside of Pixar, she mentors girls to get them interested in STEM through groups like Girls Who Code. She says yes to every talk which provides a platform to inspire and encourage girls to dreams and pursue it by getting into STEM fields. In fact, the made with code, which is an initiative launched by Google, was kick started with her inspiring keynote.

In 2015, she appeared in the documentary Code: Debugging the Gender Gap. In November 2015, she delivered a talk on science and art at TED talks live at New York. It was also streamed by PBS.

Filmography

Feature films

Short films

Awards

See also 

 List of Pixar films
 List of Pixar shorts
 Women in computing

References

Pixar people
American cinematographers
Harvard University alumni
Living people
American computer scientists
American women computer scientists
21st-century American engineers
American women cinematographers
Annie Award winners
Year of birth missing (living people)
21st-century American women